Rich Balchan (born January 18, 1989) is a retired American soccer player.

College and amateur

Born in Carmel, Indiana, Balchan attended Carmel High School, and played club soccer for Carmel United Cosmos, before going on to play four years of college soccer at Indiana University. He was named to the Big Ten All-Freshman Team following his first season in 2007, was named to the Big Ten Championship all-tournament team as a sophomore in 2008, was named to the All-Big Ten second-team and the NSCAA All-Great Lakes Region third-team as a junior in 2009, and was an All-Big Ten first team member, a Big Ten All-Tournament team pick and a member of the NSCAA All-Great Lakes region third-team following his senior year in 2010. He finished his college career with 4 goals and 7 assists in 80 games for the Hoosiers.

During his college years Balchan also played in the USL Premier Development League for Fort Wayne Fever and Chicago Fire Premier, and for half a season with FC Indiana in the National Premier Soccer League in 2009 (he transferred to Chicago halfway through the season). He was part of the Fire squad which reached the 2009 PDL championship game, but did not play in the final itself (which they lost 2–1 to Ventura County Fusion) after suffering an injury in the semi-final against the Cary Clarets.

Professional

On January 14, 2011, Balchan was drafted in the first round (12th overall) in the 2011 MLS SuperDraft by the Columbus Crew. He made his professional debut on February 22, 2011 in the first leg of the Crew's CONCACAF Champions League quarter-final series against Real Salt Lake, and played his first league game with the Crew on March 19, 2011 in the season opener against D.C. United.

Balchan scored his first professional goal at Red Bull Arena on June 4, 2011 during a regular season match against the New York Red Bulls. He received a cross from Justin Meram and hit a sliding one-timer to equalize the game with about 30 seconds before the final whistle.

Balchan was released by Columbus following an injury-plagued 2012 season including 3 sports hernia surgeries after being pushed to play through a groin tear from July–November 2011.  The operations kept him out most of 2012.

After signing with Real Salt Lake in 2013, Balchan was released at the end of their 2014 season following an injury plagued 2 years including shoulder and sports hernia surgeries.  He subsequently signed with NASL club Tampa Bay Rowdies in March 2015. He was released in November 2015.

Balchan was released by the Rowdies at the end of the 2015 NASL season, and signed with Canadian club Ottawa Fury FC in January 2016. He played a match for their academy team in the third-tier Première Ligue de soccer du Québec. After rupturing all three tendons in his left hamstring against FC Edmonton, Balchan underwent season ending surgery.  Balchan recovered in time to roster for the final match of the season, and on 13 December 2016, he was released by the club. On March 1, 2017, he signed with Pittsburgh Riverhounds of the USL. On April 29, in just his sixth start of the season, Balchan ruptured his achilles requiring season ending surgery. His contract expired at the end of the season and was not renewed by the club.

International

Balchan played with United States U-20 National Team in early 2008, and was  later a part of a U-20 squad which played England against reserve squads from Manchester United and Bolton Wanderers.

References

External links
 
 Indiana profile

1989 births
Living people
American soccer players
Carmel High School (Indiana) alumni
Indiana Hoosiers men's soccer players
Fort Wayne Fever players
Chicago Fire U-23 players
Columbus Crew players
Real Salt Lake players
Tampa Bay Rowdies players
Ottawa Fury FC players
Pittsburgh Riverhounds SC players
Soccer players from Michigan
USL League Two players
Major League Soccer players
North American Soccer League players
United States men's under-20 international soccer players
People from Carmel, Indiana
Columbus Crew draft picks
Soccer players from Indiana
Expatriate soccer players in Canada
Association football defenders
National Premier Soccer League players
Atlantic City FC players